Anolis fugitivus, the green-headed grass anole or Moa anole, is a species of lizard in the family Dactyloidae. The species is found in Cuba.

References

Anoles
Endemic fauna of Cuba
Reptiles of Cuba
Reptiles described in 1975
Taxa named by Orlando H. Garrido